Downsize or Downsizing may refer to: 

 Downsizing an image in digital graphics, see Image scaling;
 Downsize (automobile), reduce size of a motor vehicle
 Downsizing (film), a 2017 science fiction comedy film by Alexander Payne
 Downsizing (property), moving to a smaller property
 Engine downsizing, trend in the combustion engines construction
 Layoff, temporary suspension or permanent termination of the employment of employees.